The Honourable Tenant (Spanish:El Honorable inquilino) is a 1951 Argentine comedy film directed by Carlos Schlieper and starring Alberto Closas, Olga Zubarry and Amalia Sánchez Ariño. The film's sets were designed by Carlos T. Dowling.

Cast
 Alberto Closas as Luis Ayala 
 Olga Zubarry as Ana María  
 Amalia Sánchez Ariño as Alfonsina  
 Osvaldo Miranda as Martín 
 Pedro Quartucci as Juancho  
 Severo Fernandez as Mr. Larica  
 Nélida Romero as Elena  
 Hugo Pimentel as Fredo  
 Amalia Bernabé as Ernestina 
 Pablo Cumo as Lorenzo Corsi 
 Elda Dessel as Rosalía 
 Carmen Giménez as Sra. González 
 Miguel Bebán
 Adelaida Demichelis
 Roberto Durán  
 Enrique Fava 
 Julio Heredia 
 Alberto Lenti 
 Edda Mancini 
 Arsenio Perdiguero 
 Norma Suarez

External links
 

1951 films
1951 comedy films
Argentine comedy films
1950s Spanish-language films
Argentine black-and-white films
Films directed by Carlos Schlieper
1950s Argentine films